Muskö is an island in the southern part of Stockholm archipelago, which forms part of Haninge Municipality, Stockholm County, Sweden. It is best known for the Muskö naval base. There are also two urban areas (tätort) on the island: Muskö and Hoppet.

Yxlö is itself connected to the mainland by a series of road bridges.

The island of Muskö is divided into east and west halves by the Muskö Canal, an artificial channel first dug at the beginning of the 18th century and re-excavated in the 1930s.

References

External links 
 

Islands of Haninge Municipality
Islands of the Stockholm archipelago
Populated places in Haninge Municipality